The Eau Claire Bears was the primary nickname of the minor league baseball teams from Eau Claire, Wisconsin. Eau Claire was a member of the Class C Northern League (1933-1942, 1946–62) and were affiliates of the Boston Red Sox (1936), Chicago Cubs (1937-1939) and the Boston Braves (1947-1962). The team played its home games at Carson Park in Eau Claire. Baseball Hall of Fame Inductees Hank Aaron, Joe Torre and Ford C. Frick Award recipient Bob Uecker played for Eau Claire.

History
Originally named the Eau Claire Cardinals, the team adopted its most enduring nickname when new owners bought the team in July of its first season.  Beginning in 1954, the Eau Claire Bears were renamed the Eau Claire Braves after the Boston Braves moved to Milwaukee.

The Bears, along with the rest of the Northern League, did not play the 1943-45 seasons due to World War II.

In 1998, an amateur team in Eau Claire began using the Bears name and has been a member of the Chippewa River Baseball League ever since. Along with many league titles, they also won the Wisconsin Baseball Association (WBA) state championship in 2005, 2008, and 2009.

Stadiums

From 1933-1938 Eau Claire played at Chappell Field, which seated 2,000 with temporary bleachers.

From 1937-1962 teams played at Carson Park, which still exists today. Built in 1937, the park had a capacity of 3500. It is located at 1 Carson Park Drive. Today, Carson Park is home to the Eau Claire Express of the summer collegiate Northwoods League and the new Eau Claire Bears of the Chippewa River Baseball League.

Hank Aaron

The most accomplished player in the team's history was Hall of Famer Hank Aaron, who made his minor league début with the team in 1952. Aaron arrived to the team in mid June, 1952, after signing a contract with the Braves on June 15 for $350 per month. Aaron played shortstop and breaking from his cross-handed style of batting, was selected to play in the 1952 Northern League All-Star Game. He was selected as the league's Rookie of the Year at the conclusion of the season. Aaron hit .336 with 9 Home Runs for Eau Claire, helping the team to a 72-53 record. Today, there is a statue of Aaron and plaque in front of Carson Park to honor his achievements. Aaron was present for the statue dedication ceremonies on August 17, 1994.

Notable Eau Claire alumni

Baseball Hall of Fame alumni
 Hank Aaron (1952) Inducted, 1982
 Joe Torre (1960)  Inducted, 2014
 Bob Uecker (1956-1957) Inducted, Ford C. Frick Award (2003)

Notable alumni
 Bill Robinson (1962)
 Rico Carty (1961) MLB All-Star ; 1970 NL batting champion
 Walt Hriniak (1961) 
 Denny Lemaster (1958) MLB All-Star 
 Tony Cloninger (1958)
 Tommie Aaron (1958-1959)
 Lee Maye (1955)
 Charlie Root (1954, MGR)
 Wes Covington (1952)
 Johnny Goryl (1952) 
 Bill Bruton (1950) 3 × NL stolen base leader
 Pete Whisenant (1947)
 Chuck Tanner (1947-1948) Manager: 1979 World Series Champion - Pittsburgh Pirates
 Jim Delsing (1946) (Father of Pro Golfer Jay Delsing)
 Dave Garcia (1942) 
 Rosy Ryan (1941-1942) 1961 King of Baseball Award
 Wes Westrum (1941) 2 × MLB All-Star 
 Andy Pafko (1940) 5 × MLB All-Star 
 Stan Spence (1935) 4 × MLB All-Star 
 Hank Majeski (1935)
 Johnny Mostil (1933-1937) 2 × AL stolen base leader

References

External links 
 Northern League team history
 Official site of "Henry Aaron’s Summer Up North", documentary on Hank Aaron and the 1952 Bears

Defunct minor league baseball teams
Sports in Eau Claire, Wisconsin
1933 establishments in Wisconsin
1962 disestablishments in Wisconsin
Milwaukee Braves minor league affiliates
Chicago Cubs minor league affiliates
Boston Red Sox minor league affiliates
Northern League (1902-71) baseball teams
Boston Braves minor league affiliates
Boston Bees minor league affiliates
Baseball teams established in 1933
Baseball teams disestablished in 1962
Defunct baseball teams in Wisconsin